Field hockey at the 2010 Summer Youth Olympics was held at the Sengkang Hockey Stadium in Singapore.

Medalists

Results

Preliminaries

Classification

Fifth place match

Bronze medal match

Gold medal match

Goalscorers

References

External links
Pool matches summary
Classification summary
1st Youth Olympic Games (W)

Girls
2010 in women's field hockey
2010 Summer Youth Olympics